Dyuden (or Tudan) was a brother of Toqta the Khan of the Golden Horde and the great grandson of Batu Khan. He was appointed as a general by Toqta and "Dyuden's campaign" devastated fourteen towns in the territory of modern Russia in 1293, including Moscow, while Toqta himself captured Tver forcing the Grand Prince to abdicate.

Dyudan had a son, Shchelkan, who was ambassador of the Uzbek Khan in Tver in 1327.

References

External links
Wikisource entry (in Russian)

Generals of the Mongol Empire
Golden Horde
Borjigin